Jakub Sukeľ (born 23 January 1996) is a Slovak professional ice hockey right winger for HC '05 Banská Bystrica of the Slovak Extraliga. He has played a total of 203 games in the Slovak Extraliga up to the end of the 2019–20 season.

Sukeľ began his professional career with MHk 32 Liptovský Mikuláš in 2015. He remained with the team until January 14, 2020, when he signed for HC Košice. On July 27, 2020, he joined HC Slovan Bratislava on a two-year contract.

Career statistics

Regular season and playoffs

Awards and honors

References

External links

 

1996 births
Living people
Sportspeople from Liptovský Mikuláš
Slovak ice hockey right wingers
MHk 32 Liptovský Mikuláš players
HC Košice players
HC Slovan Bratislava players
HC '05 Banská Bystrica players